Bhadrapur may refer to:

Bhadrapur, Birbhum, West Bengal
Bhadrapur, Mahakali, a village development committee in Dadeldhura District in the Mahakali Zone of western Nepal
Bhadrapur, Mechi, a town and municipality in Jhapa District in the Mechi Zone of southeastern Nepal